The 1963–64 Greek Football Cup was the 22nd edition of the Greek Football Cup. 

The Final was scratched and AEK Athens were awarded the cup after Panathinaikos and Olympiacos were ejected from the competition following the abandonment of their semi-final in the 115th minute with the score 1–1 due to riots by supporters from both teams, who believed the match had been fixed to end in a draw in order to have a replay for financial reasons (this was the same reason that the Final of 1961–62 was abandoned and the Cup withheld).

Calendar
From Round of 32 onwards:

Knockout phase
In the knockout phase, teams play against each other over a single match. If the match ends up as a draw, extra time will be played and if the match remains a draw a replay match is set at the home of the guest team which the extra time rule stands as well. If a winner doesn't occur after the replay match the winner emerges by a flip of a coin.The mechanism of the draws for each round is as follows:
In the draw for the round of 32, the teams that had qualified to previous' season Round of 16 are seeded and the clubs that passed the qualification round are unseeded.

In the draws for the round of 16 onwards, there are no seedings, and teams from the same group can be drawn against each other.

Bracket

Round of 32

||colspan="2" rowspan="9" 

||colspan="2" rowspan="6" 

|}

Round of 16

||colspan="2" rowspan="7" 

|}

Quarter-finals

|}

Semi-finals

|}

* The match was abandoned in the 115th minute with the score at 1–1 due to riots from the supporters of both clubs against their teams for the same reasons that the 1961–62 final was abandoned; both teams were ejected from the competition.

Final
The Final was scratched and AEK Athens were awarded the Cup after Panathinaikos and Olympiacos were ejected from the competition.

References

External links
Greek Cup 1963-64 at RSSSF

Greek Football Cup seasons
Greek Cup
Cup